David Manukyan (born November 19, 1969 in Leninakan, Armenian SSR, Soviet Union) is a Ukrainian Greco Roman wrestler of Armenian descent. He came in fourth place at the 2000 Summer Olympics.

References

External links
 

1969 births
Living people
Sportspeople from Gyumri
Wrestlers at the 2000 Summer Olympics
Ukrainian male sport wrestlers
Olympic wrestlers of Ukraine
Ukrainian people of Armenian descent
European Wrestling Championships medalists
20th-century Ukrainian people
21st-century Ukrainian people